CDEC may refer to:

California Data Exchange Center, a part of the Division of Flood Management, California Department of Water Resources
Captured Document Exploitation Center, a U.S. Army organization
Career Development & Employment Centre, located on the campus of the University of Sussex in England
Centro di Documentazione Ebraica Contemporanea (Center of Contemporary Jewish Documentation), in Milan, Italy
Colorado Department of Early Childhood
Combat Development Experimentation Command, another U.S. Army organization
CDEC Gaming, a Chinese Dota 2 team